Cinetorhynchus reticulatus is a species of shrimp belonging to the family Rhynchocinetidae, known by the common name green-eye dancing shrimp or reticulated hinge-beak shrimp.

Distribution
Cinetorhynchus reticulatus is widespread throughout the tropical waters of the Indo-Pacific region, including the Red Sea.

Description

References

External links
 

Caridea
Crustaceans described in 1997